Glycymeris bimaculata is a marine bivalve mollusc in the family Glycymerididae.

Description
This species is one of the largest bivalves in the Mediterranean Sea. Shells have a round shape with quite variable markings.

Distribution
This species is widespread in the Mediterranean Sea.

References

 Gofas, S.; Le Renard, J.; Bouchet, P. (2001). Mollusca. in: Costello, M.J. et al. (Ed.) (2001). European register of marine species: a check-list of the marine species in Europe and a bibliography of guides to their identification. Collection Patrimoines Naturels. 50: pp. 180–213.
 Ivana Bušelića, Melita Pehardaa Glycymeris bimaculata (Poli, 1795) — A new sclerochronological archive for the Mediterranean? Journal of Sea Research - Volume 95, January 2015, Pages 139–148

External links
 Jsanton Shells Collection

bimaculata
Bivalves described in 1795
Taxa named by Giuseppe Saverio Poli